The Younian language or Younian dialect is a Pinghua dialect of northern Guangxi, China. It is spoken by ethnic Red Yao people in Longsheng County, Guilin, Guangxi province. There were more than 10,000 native speakers in 1997. It has been documented in detail by Ouyang (2010).

References

Ōuyáng, Lán 欧阳澜. 2010. Guǎngxī lóngshèng hépíng xiāng yōuniànhuà yǔyīn cíhuì yánjiū 广西龙胜和平乡优念话语音词汇研究 [Research on the phonetics and vocabulary of Younianhua in Heping Town]. Doctoral dissertation, Guǎngxī Normal University 广西师范大学.
Li, Xinghui [李星辉]. Xiangan Jianghua Hanyu Tuhua yu Yaoyu bijiao yanjiu [湘南江华汉语土话与瑶语比较研究]. Beijing: Science Press [科学出版社]. 

Varieties of Chinese
Sino-Tibetan languages
Yao people